Karl Elsener (9 October 1860 - 26 December 1918) was a Swiss cutler, inventor and entrepreneur.

Karl Elsener completed an apprenticeship as a knife maker in Zug. After some journeyman years he opened a factory in Ibach, Switzerland in 1884 for the manufacture of knives and surgical instruments. He started production of the Swiss army knife in Switzerland in 1891 and developed his knife manufacturing company into what has become Victorinox.

From 1912 to 1918 Elsener was a member of the cantonal parliament of the Canton of Schwyz. He was married three times.

After him his son, Carl Elsener (1886-1950), and his grandson Carl Elsener senior (1922-2013) and his great-grandson Carl Elsener Jr. (born 1958) led the Victorinox company.

References

External links 

 Blog Victorinox Swiss Army watches
 Victorinox - página oficial

External links
 
 Official website Victorinox

19th-century Swiss inventors
20th-century Swiss businesspeople
Cutlers
1860 births
1918 deaths